Houndsfield Primary School is a coeducational primary school located in the Edmonton area of London, England. The school was founded in 1903.

History
Houndsfield Primary School was built in 1903 by Edmonton School Board as an elementary school. Later on a new wing for juniors was added in 1935. After the 1944 Act the senior departments became a mixed secondary modern, now AIM North London Academy.

Houndsfield Road board school opened in 1903 with departments for boys, girls, and mixed juniors on different floors in one building and for infants in a second building. It was reorganized for boys, girls, and infants in 1926 and became a junior mixed and infants' school in 1931. A new wing was added to the juniors' building in 1935. The schools were attended by a total of 1,003 children in 1906 and 1,084 in 1919. There were 311 children on the roll at the junior school in 1973 and 305 infants, including 60 in the nursery class.

Previously a community school administered by Enfield London Borough Council, in February 2019 Houndsfield Primary School converted to academy status. The school is now sponsored by the Attigo Academy Trust.

References

External links
Houndsfield Primary School official website

Primary schools in the London Borough of Enfield
Educational institutions established in 1903
1903 establishments in England
Academies in the London Borough of Enfield
Edmonton, London